Perowne is an English surname which is a double diminutive of Piers and of Huguenot origin. It may refer to:
 Arthur Perowne (1930–2018), English amateur golfer
 Barry Perowne pseudonym of the British writer Philip Atkey (1908–1985)
 Brian Perowne (born 1947), retired Royal Navy admiral
 James Perowne (born 1947), retired Royal Navy admiral
 Lancelot Perowne (1902–1982), British Army general
 Victor Perowne (1897–1951), British diplomat

or the descendants of John Perowne, priest and missionary to Burdwan:
 John Perowne (1823–1904), Bishop of Worcester
 John Perowne (army officer) (1863–1954), son of John
 Arthur Perowne (1867–1948), Bishop of Bradford, and of Worcester; son of John
 Stewart Perowne (1901–1989), diplomat, archaeologist, explorer and historian; son of Arthur
 Freya Stark (1893–1993), British explorer and travel writer; sometime wife of Stewart
 Thomas Perowne (died 1913) (1824–1913), Archdeacon of Norwich; brother of John
 Thomas Perowne (died 1954) (1868–1954), Archdeacon of Norwich; son of Thomas
 Edward Perowne (1826–1906), priest, Vice-Chancellor of the University of Cambridge; brother of John

See also
 Bishop Perowne CofE College, Worcester, England
 Perowne Barracks, former British Army barracks in Hong Kong

Footnotes